HomeShop18 was an Indian online and on-air shopping channel. Previously, it was owned by the Network 18 Group division of Reliance Industries.
But, now it was closed by Network 18 Group on 24 May 2019. According to close sources, there is news of the re-opening of HomeShop18 with a new name in 2023.

Investors 
GS Home Shopping of South Korea, the third-largest and dominant home shopping company in the e-commerce market, has a 1.89% stake in the company. Skyblue Buildwell Pvt. Ltd.  has the controlling stake of 16%.

Television channel 
The HomeShop18 television channel was launched on 9 April 2008. The television network can be currently seen on cable, satellite and some terrestrial channels in India.

It also became the country's first ever 24/7 home shopping channel to be available on DD Free Dish reach, a free-to-air direct-to-home (DTH) broadcasting platform of Prasar Bharati. The channel was made available from 1 November 2015.

Acquisitions

HomeShop18 has acquired two companies, namely, Coinjoos.com and Shop CJ Network. Coinjoos was acquired in 2011 and Shop CJ Network was acquired in 2017. Coinjoos was an online music and books retailer and Shop CJ Network was a home shopping channel.

Carriage 
HomeShop18 TV channel is available to all cable operators & leading DTH players: Tata Sky-151, Dish TV- 118, Reliance- 219, Airtel- 112, DD Free Dish-45.

References 

Gurvinder Singh appointed as the new CEO of HomeShop18 by Network18

Companies based in Noida
Shopping networks
Online retailers of India
Retail companies established in 2008
Retail companies disestablished in 2019
2008 establishments in Uttar Pradesh